Woodruff High School may mean:

 Woodruff High School (Arkansas), a former high school in West Helena, Arkansas in Helena-West Helena School District
 E. N. Woodruff High School, a public high school in Peoria Public Schools District 150 in Peoria, Illinois, and referred to since 2011 by its school district as Woodruff Career and Technical Center
 Woodruff High School (South Carolina), a public school in Woodruff, South Carolina
 Arbor Vitae-Woodruff High School, a former high school in Woodruff, Wisconsin, that merged to form Lakeland Union High School in 1957